Gyöngyösi utca (Gyöngyösi Street) is a station on the Budapest Metro Line 3 (North-South). It is located under Váci út at its intersection with the streets Gyöngyösi utca and Meder utca. The station was opened on 14 December 1990 as part of the extension from Árpád híd.

It serves the residential and commercial parts of northwestern and northern Angyalföld, including the Duna Pláza shopping mall, which features an underground walkway to the station. Next to the station, there is a smaller microraion with prefabricated block of flats. It also serves the new upscale residential complex Marina part, located up on the Danube.

Connections
Bus: 15, 105

References

M3 (Budapest Metro) stations
Railway stations opened in 1990